A Belfast bap is a large crusty white bread roll that originates from Belfast, Northern Ireland. It is best known today eaten as part of an Ulster fry as the bread in a breakfast sandwich, but can be eaten as a regular sandwich bap.

The bread is noted for its size being around half a small pan loaf (150–200 g), airy, chewy soft white interior and a distinctive hard crust that is almost burnt on the top. It originate from master baker, Bernard Hughes, who created this bread to feed the poor of Belfast during the Great Famine.

The bread can be found from bakeries and supermarkets in and around the city of Belfast, but is fairly unknown outside Northern Ireland.

See also 

 Cuisine of Ireland
 List of bread rolls
 List of breads
 List of buns

References 

Irish breads
Cuisine of Northern Ireland
Culture in Belfast